Wyandotte County (county code WY) is a county in the U.S. state of Kansas. As of the 2020 census, the population was 169,245, making it Kansas's fourth-most populous county. Its county seat and most populous city is Kansas City, with which it shares a unified government. Wyandotte County also includes the city of Bonner Springs. The County is directly north of Johnson County, Kansas, and west of Kansas City, Missouri.

History

The Wyandot
The county is named after the Wyandot (also known as Wyandott or Wyandotte) Indians. They were called the Huron by the French in Canada, but called themselves Wendat. They were distantly related to the Iroquois, with whom they sometimes fought. They had hoped to keep white Americans out of their territory and to make the Ohio River the border between the United States and Canada.

One branch of the Wyandot moved to the area that is now the state of Ohio. They generally took the course of assimilation into Anglo-American society. Many of them embraced Christianity under the influence of missionaries. They were transported to the current Wyandotte County in 1843, where they set up a community and worked in cooperation with Anglo settlers. The Christian Munsee also influenced this area's early settlement.

The Wyandot in Kansas set up a constitutional form of government they had devised in Ohio. They set up the territorial government for Kansas and Nebraska, and elected one of their own territorial governor.

Other historical facts
The county was organized in 1859. Tenskwatawa (Tecumseh's brother), "the Prophet", fought at the Battle of Tippecanoe in 1811. He was buried at Shawnee Native American historical site Whitefeather Spring, at 3818 Ruby Ave.  Kansas City, which was added in 1975 to the National Register of Historic Places in 1975. The Kansas City Smelting and Refining Company employed over 250 men during the 1880s. The ore and base bullion is received from the mountains' mining districts and is crushed, separated and refined.

The Delaware Crossing (or "Military Crossing"; sometimes "the Secondine") was where the old Indian trail met the waters of the Kaw River. Circa 1831, Moses Grinter, one of the area's earliest permanent white settlers, set up the Grinter Ferry on the Kansas River there. His house was known as the Grinter Place. The ferry was used by traders, freighters, and soldiers traveling between Fort Leavenworth and Fort Scott on the military road. Others crossed this area on their way to Santa Fe.

The Diocese of Leavenworth moved its see from Leavenworth, Kansas to Kansas City, Kansas on 10 May 1947. It became an archdiocese on 9 August 1952.

Geography
It is Kansas's smallest county by area.

Topography
The county's natural topography consists of gently rolling terrain. The Kansas River forms part of the county's southern boundary. The elevation generally increases from south to north as the distance from the Kansas River and Missouri River increases.

Watersheds and streams

The county is drained by the watersheds of the Kansas River, which is part of the Missouri River watershed. It receives plentiful rainfall.

Adjacent counties
 Platte County, Missouri (north)
 Clay County, Missouri (northeast)
 Jackson County, Missouri (east)
 Johnson County (south)
 Leavenworth County (west)

Demographics

Wyandotte County is included in the Kansas City, MO-KS Metropolitan Statistical Area.

As of the census of 2000, there were 157,882 people, 59,700 households, and 39,163 families residing in the county. The population density was 1,043 people per square mile (403/km2). There were 65,892 housing units at an average density of 435 per square mile (168/km2). The racial makeup of the county was 58.18% White, 28.33% Black or African American, 1.63% Asian, 0.74% Native American, 0.04% Pacific Islander, 8.17% from other races, and 2.91% from two or more races. Hispanic or Latino of any race were 16.00% of the population.

By 2007, 48.1% of Wyandotte County's population was non-Hispanic whites. 26.3% of the population was African-American. Native Americans made up 0.6% of the population, Asians 1.8%, and Latinos 21.7%.

There were 59,700 households, of which 32.60% had children under the age of 18 living with them, 42.10% were married couples living together, 17.80% had a female householder with no husband present, and 34.40% were non-families. 28.90% of all households were made up of individuals, and 10.00% had someone living alone who was 65 years of age or older. The average household size was 2.62 and the average family size was 3.24.

In the county, the population was spread out, with 28.50% under the age of 18, 10.40% from 18 to 24, 29.50% from 25 to 44, 19.90% from 45 to 64, and 11.70% who were 65 years of age or older. The median age was 32. For every 100 females there were 95.40 males. For every 100 females age 18 and over, there were 91.3 males.

The median income for a household in the county was $33,784, and the median income for a family was $40,333. Males had a median income of $31,335 versus $24,640 for females. The per capita income for the county was $16,005. About 12.5% of families and 16.5% of the population were below the poverty line, including 23% of those under age 18 and 11.1% of those 65 or older.

Approximately 1.4% of the county's residents take public transportation to work. This is the highest percentage in the state.

Government

Law
The Wyandotte County Sheriff's Department oversees the Wyandotte County Jail. The Bonner Springs Police Department, Edwardsville Police Department, and the Kansas City Kansas Police Department serve those respective cities in Wyandotte County.

Wyandotte County was a prohibition, or "dry", county until the Kansas Constitution was amended in 1986 and voters approved the sale of liquor by the individual drink with a 30% food sales requirement. Voters removed the food sales requirement in 1988.

The county voted against the 2022 Kansas Value Them Both Amendment, an anti-abortion ballot measure, by 74% to 26%, outpacing its support of Joe Biden during the 2020 presidential election.

Presidential elections

Unlike almost every other county in Kansas, Wyandotte County has been solidly Democratic ever since the New Deal. This is largely due to its highly urbanized nature and significant minority population. The only Democrat to lose Wyandotte County since 1932 has been George McGovern in Richard Nixon’s 49-state landslide of 1972, when Nixon swept all 275 counties in Oklahoma, Kansas, and Nebraska. Wyandotte was the only county in Kansas to vote for Franklin D. Roosevelt in 1944, Adlai Stevenson II in both 1952 and 1956, Hubert Humphrey in 1968, Jimmy Carter in 1980, and Walter Mondale in 1984. No Republican presidential nominee has managed even 40% of the vote since Ronald Reagan in 1984.

Economy
Village West, at the intersection of Interstates 70 and 435, has significantly fueled growth in KCK and Wyandotte County. Anchored by the Kansas Speedway, its attractions and retailers include Hollywood Casino, Legends Outlets Kansas City, Cabela's, Nebraska Furniture Mart, Great Wolf Lodge, Legends Field (Kansas City) (home to the Kansas City Monarchs (American Association) of the American Association) and Children's Mercy Park (home of Sporting Kansas City of Major League Soccer).

Also in Wyandotte County are Azura Amphitheater (commonly known as the Sandstone Amphitheater), the National Agricultural Center and Hall of Fame, Wyandotte County Park, and Sunflower Hills Golf Course.

Colleges and universities
Public
 Kansas City Kansas Community College 
 University of Kansas Medical Center 
Private
 Donnelly College

School districts
 Turner USD 202
 Piper USD 203
 Bonner Springs–Edwardsville USD 204
 Kansas City USD 500

Private schools
Primary
 Resurrection Grade School (formerly St. Peter's Cathedral Grade School)
 St. Patrick's Grade School
 Christ the King Grade School
Secondary
 Bishop Ward High School

Other schools
 Kansas State School for the Blind (KSSB)

Communities

Incorporated cities
 Kansas City
 Bonner Springs (partly in Leavenworth and Johnson counties)
 Edwardsville
 Lake Quivira (partly in Johnson County)

Unincorporated communities

 Argentine - formerly a city annexed by Kansas City in 1910
 Armourdale - formerly a city consolidated with Kansas City in 1886
 Armstrong - town absorbed by Wyandotte
 Morris
 Loring
 Piper - annexed by Kansas City in 1991
 Rosedale - formerly a city consolidated with Kansas City in 1922
 Turner
 Wyandotte - Formerly a city consolidated with Kansas City in 1886
 Welborn

Townships
Wyandotte County has a single township. The cities of Bonner Springs, Kansas City, and Lake Quivira are considered governmentally independent and excluded from the township's census. In the following table, the population center is the largest city (or cities) included in that township's population total, if it is of significant size.

The 2010 census lists the city of Edwardsville as also governmentally independent, with the size of the remaining township dropping to a population of 31 living on 2.43 sq mi of land (and 0.36 sq mi water), resulting in a population density of 12.76/sq mi (4.93 / km2). The Kansas State Historical Society also confirms Edwardsville's departure.

See also
 National Register of Historic Places listings in Wyandotte County, Kansas

References

Notes

Further reading

 Historic Preservation.  Kansas City, Kansas, Urban Planning & Land Use
 Sween, Argentine Pictures. Interactive Genealogy.  Pictorial History of Wyandotte County, KS.
 Historical Wyandotte County. Kansas Heritage, Kansas Community Network.
 Views of the Past.  Kansas City, Kansas Bicentennial Commission.
 Sween, Bonner Springs and Edwardsville. Virtual Bonner Springs, KS.
 Kansas City, Kansas; Joe H. Vaughan; Arcadia Publishing; 2012; .
 Tuttle and Pike's Atlas of Kansas City, Kansas; Tuttle & Pike; 13 pages; 1907.
 Complete Set of Surveys and Plats or Properties in Wyandotte County and Kansas City Kansas; G.M. Hopkins & Co; 51 pages; 1887.

External links

County
 
 Wyandotte County - Directory of Public Officials
Other
 Kansas City / Wyandotte County Convention and Visitors Bureau
 Wyandotte County Economic Development Council
Historical
 Wyandotte County Kansas History and Heritage Project
Maps
 Wyandotte County maps: Current, Historic, KDOT
 Kansas Highway maps: Current, Historic, KDOT
 Kansas Railroad maps: Current, 1996, 1915, KDOT and Kansas Historical Society

 
Kansas counties
Kansas placenames of Native American origin
1859 establishments in Kansas Territory
Kansas counties on the Missouri River